Mayong (or Mayang) is a village in Morigaon district, Assam, India. Mayong is a tourist attraction because of its history.

Etymology
The origin of the name may be based in the Chutia/Tiwa/Deori word Ma-yong which means mother, the Kachari word for an elephant (Miyong), and ongo meaning part. Some believe that Manipuris from the Moirang clan used to inhabit this area therefore; the name Moirang became Mayhong with time.

Mythology
Mayong along with Pragjyotishpura (the ancient name of Assam) find place in many  epics, including the Mahabharata. Chief Ghatotkacha of Kachari Kingdom took part in The Great Battle of Mahabharata with his magical powers. It was also said about the Mayong that the Tantrik (one who knows tantra vidya) and the witches take shelter in mayong forest till now. According to recently published article on "Mayong - Land of Black Magic and Witchcraft" - many tales of men disappearing into thin air, people being converted into animals, or beasts being magically tamed, have been associated with Mayong. Sorcery and magic were traditionally practiced and passed down over generations.

History
Narabali or human sacrifices were carried  until the early modern period . Excavators had recently dug up swords and other sharp weapons that resembled tools used for human sacrifice in other parts of India, suggesting that human sacrifice may have occurred in the Ahom era in Mayong.

Tourism
Mayong is a tourist and archaeological location because of its rich wildlife, archaeology pilgrimage, eco-tourism, adventure tourism, cultural tourism and river tourism.

Mayong Central Museum and Emporium
There are numerous archaeological relics and artefacts, including books on Tantra Kriya and Ayurveda at the Mayong Central Museum and Emporium, which was opened in 2002.Very close to Mayong is the Pobitora Wildlife Sanctuary. This Sanctuary has the highest density of one horned rhinoceros in the world.

See also
Tourism in Assam

References

3. Mayong - Land of Black Magic and Witchcraft

4. Morigaon District Administration

5. Mayong news and black magic of Mayong

6. Mayong black magical stories in bengali

Morigaon
Tourism in Assam
Cities and towns in Morigaon district